Nyuya Severnaya (Xotugu Ñüüye) is a rural locality (a selo), one of two settlements, in addition to Dorozhny, the administrative centre of the Rural Okrug, in Murbaysky Rural Okrug of Lensky District in the Sakha Republic, Russia. Its population as of the 2002 Census was 168.

References

Notes

Sources
Official website of the Sakha Republic. Registry of the Administrative-Territorial Divisions of the Sakha Republic. Lensky District. 

Rural localities in Lensky District, Sakha Republic